The Mexican grizzly bear (Ursus arctos horribilis, formerly Ursus arctos nelsoni) is an extinct population of the grizzly bear in Mexico.

The holotype was shot by H. A. Cluff at Colonia Garcia, Chihuahua in 1899. The extinct California grizzly bear extended slightly south into Baja California. The bears in Durango, Chihuahua, Sonora and central Mexico were likely more related to the bears of Arizona, New Mexico and Texas than to those of California.

Description
Due to its silver fur, it was often named in Spanish as el oso plateado (the silvery bear). This bear was also described to have been of a dark color and only rarely with a reddish coat. 
The Mexican grizzly was smaller than the grizzlies in the United States and Canada. The general color was pale buffy yellow varying to grayish-white, grizzled from the darker color of the underfur. Specimens in worn pelage varied to yellowish-brown and reddish. The longest fur hairs were on the throat and the flanks. The belly was sparsely haired, lacking the thick underfur of the back and the flanks.

Range and habitat
The bear inhabited the northern territories of Mexico, in particular the temperate grasslands and mountainous pine forests. Its previous range reached from across Aridoamerica, from Arizona to New Mexico, Texas and Mexico. It seems unlikely that the bears would have hibernated although they may have spent some time in winter dens.

Biology
Like all brown bears, Mexican grizzlies were omnivores. Their diet mainly consisted of plants, fruits and insects, and it is reported that it was very fond of ants, like most brown bears. Occasionally it fed also on small mammals and carrion. Females produced one to three cubs every three years or so.

mtDNA Phylogeny
This bear is within Mitochondrial DNA (mtDNA) Clade 4, as are all of the extant NA brown bears.

Extinction
The first Europeans to come in contact with the Mexican grizzly were the conquistadors in the 16th century, when Francisco Vásquez de Coronado went on an expedition to find the Seven Cities of Gold. His expedition began in Mexico City in 1540, and went north to New Mexico and the Great Plains in the modern-day U.S. states of Texas and Kansas. Because the bears hunted the cattle from time to time, they were considered as pests by farmers. Grizzlies were trapped, shot and poisoned, and had already become scarce by the 1930s. By 1960, only 30 individuals were said to remain. Despite its protected status, the hunting continued. By 1964, the Mexican grizzly was regarded as being extinct. After rumours of some surviving individuals on a ranch at the headwaters of the Yaqui River in the state of Sonora in 1968, American biologist Dr. Carl B. Koford went on a three-month survey but without success. A grizzly was shot in 1976 in Sonora, the fourth confirmed in Sonora, and the first in many decades. The Mexican grizzly is now presumed to be extinct, or perhaps only extirpated.

References

Further reading
 Julian Huxley, Martyn Bramwell et al.: The Atlas of World Wildlife, 1973
 David Day: The Doomsday Book of Animals. Ebury Press, London 1981, .
 Jane Thornbark and Martin Jenkins: The IUCN Mammal Red Data Book. Part 1: Threatened mammalian taxa of the Americas and the Australasian zoogeographic region (excluding Cetacea). International Union for the Conservation of Nature, Gland Switzerland, 1982. p. 339
 Walton Beacham: World Wildlife Fund Guide to Extinct Species of Modern Times, 1997, 
 A. Starker Leopold: Wildlife of Mexico – The Game Birds and Mammals, 1959

External links
 Endangered Species Handbook Persecution and Hunting - Bears

Grizzly bears
Extinct bears
Endemic mammals of Mexico
Extinct animals of Mexico
Mammal extinctions since 1500
Species made extinct by deliberate extirpation efforts
Bear, Mexican
Natural history of the Mexican Plateau